MZP may refer to:

Péter Márki-Zay, Hungarian politician
Mizo Zirlai Pawl, a student organization in Mizoram, India
 MZP 1, a variant of the Heckler & Koch HK69A1 grenade launcher
 Green Party of Hungary
 Migros Zentralpackerei AG, a company that merged into the Swiss company Delica
 Mirzapur railway station, code of railway station on the Howrah-Delhi main line and Howrah-Allahabad-Mumbai line in India
 Motueka Aerodrome, IATA code of airport serving Motueka, New Zealand
 Movima language, ISO 639-3 language code